Sanyaa is a special type of dried fish prepared by the Newars.

See also

 List of dried foods

Newari cuisine
Dried fish